Saša Tabaković (born April 20, 1981) is a Slovenian actor, born to Bosnian parents. After finishing his studies at High School for Music (he was playing an accordion), he entered to study a play on Academy for Theater, Radio, Film, Television, where he graduated in 2005. For the diploma performance of Goldberg in "The Birthday party" by H. Pinter he was awarded with University Preseren award in 2005.  Since that year he is a permanent member of Slovenian National Theater Drama in Ljubljana. He often sings sevdah, traditional Bosnian music, with different musical groups. He is married to Slovenian actress Polona Juh.

Notable theatre roles

 Lisander in performance "A Midsummer Night's Dream" by William Shakespeare
 Gaveston in performance "Edward the Second" by Christopher Marlowe
 Oedipus in performance "Oedipus in Corinth" by Ivo Svetina
 A Man in performance "The Class" by Matjaz Zupancic
 Zacharie Moirron in performance "Moliere or The Cabal of Hypocrites" by Mikhail Afanasevich Bulgakov
 Tigellinus in performance "Nero" by Andrej Rozman Roza, Davor Bozic
 B in performance "Rough for Theatre II" by Samuel Beckett
 Sergei Pavlovich Voynitzev in performance "Platonov" by Anton P. Chekhov
 Dorian Gray in performance "The Picture of Dorian Gray" by Oscar Wilde
 Pyotr Vasilyevich Bessemenov in performance "The Petty Bourgeois" by Maxim Gorky
 Ken in performance "Red" by J. Logan
 Andrei Prozorov in performance "Three Sisters" by Anton P. Chekhov
 Richard II in performance "Richard III + II" by W. Shakespeare, Pandur
 Barnabas and Teacher in performance "Tha Castle" by Franz Kafka
 Roberto in performance "The Lovers" by Carlo Goldoni
 Son in performance "Wake" by N. Pop Tasic
 Henry (Harry) James in performance "Alice in bed" by Susan Sontag
 Marcelo in performance "A New Race" by Matjaz Zupancic
 Biedermann in performance "Biedermann und die Brandstifter (The Fire Raisers)" by Max Frisch
 Franz Gotlieb Glass in performance "Cabaret Casper" by Tena Stivicic
 Ivan Krizovec in performance "In Agony" by Miroslav Krleza
 Septimus Smith in perforamnce "Mrs. Dalloway" by Virginia Woolf

Filmography

 the role of Ado in  In the Mountains by Miha Hočevar
 the role of Jasha in Beneath Her Window by Metod Pevec
 the role of Ian in A weekend in Brighton by Slavko Hren
 the role of Ivan Mrak in "Ivan and Karla" by Alma Lapajne

References
 http://www.drama.si/eng/ansambel/sasa-tabakovic.html
 https://www.imdb.com/name/nm1500638/
 http://www.cinemagia.ro/filme-cu-sasa-tabakovic-60377/regizate-de-marko-santic-33557/croatia/
 http://www.ikdb.de/filme/film_unter_ihrem_fenster.html
 https://www.youtube.com/watch?v=bG22SsOdHs4

1981 births
Living people
Actors from Ljubljana
Slovenian male stage actors
Slovenian male film actors
21st-century Slovenian male singers
21st-century Slovenian male actors
Slovenian people of Bosnia and Herzegovina descent